Wasu (Urdu: واسو) is a village and Union Council of Mandi Bahauddin District in the Punjab province of Pakistan. It is located at 32°34'0N 73°28'60E and has an altitude of 221 metres (728 feet).

References

Villages in Mandi Bahauddin District
Union councils of Mandi Bahauddin District